Elachista igaloensis is a moth of the family Elachistidae. It is found on Sardinia and Corsica.

References

igaloensis
Moths described in 1951
Moths of Europe